Greywacke or graywacke (German grauwacke, signifying a grey, earthy rock) is a variety of sandstone generally characterized by its hardness, dark color, and poorly sorted angular grains of quartz, feldspar, and small rock fragments or lithic fragments set in a compact, clay-fine matrix. It is a texturally immature sedimentary rock generally found in Paleozoic strata. The larger grains can be sand- to gravel-sized, and matrix materials generally constitute more than 15% of the rock by volume. The term "greywacke" can be confusing, since it can refer to either the immature (rock fragment) aspect of the rock or its fine-grained (clay) component.

The origin of greywacke was unknown until turbidity currents and turbidites were understood, since, according to the normal laws of sedimentation, gravel, sand and mud should not be laid down together. Geologists now attribute its formation to submarine avalanches or strong turbidity currents. These actions churn sediment and cause mixed-sediment slurries, in which the resulting deposits may exhibit a variety of sedimentary features. Supporting the turbidity current origin theory is that deposits of greywacke are found on the edges of the continental shelves, at the bottoms of oceanic trenches, and at the bases of mountain formational areas. They also occur in association with black shales of deep sea origin.

Greywackes are mostly grey, brown, yellow or black, dull-colored sandy rocks which may occur in thick or thin beds along with shales and limestones. They are abundant in Wales, the south of Scotland, the Longford-Down Massif in Ireland and the Lake District National Park of England; they compose the majority of the main alps that make up the backbone of New Zealand; sandstones classified as feldspathic and lithic greywacke have been recognized in Ecca Group in South Africa. They can contain a very great variety of minerals, the principal ones being quartz, orthoclase and plagioclase feldspars, calcite, iron oxides and graphitic, carbonaceous matters, together with (in the coarser kinds) fragments of such rocks as felsite, chert, slate, gneiss, various schists, and quartzite. Among other minerals found in them are biotite, chlorite, tourmaline, epidote, apatite, garnet, hornblende, augite, sphene and pyrites. The cementing material may be siliceous or argillaceous and is sometimes calcareous.

As a rule greywackes do not contain fossils, but organic remains may be common in the finer beds associated with them. Their component particles are usually not very rounded or polished, and the rocks have often been considerably indurated by recrystallization, such as the introduction of interstitial silica. In some districts the greywackes are cleaved, but they show phenomena of this kind much less perfectly than the slates. Some varieties include feldspathic greywacke, which is rich in feldspar, and lithic greywacke, which is rich in tiny rock fragments.

Although the group is so diverse that it is difficult to characterize mineralogically, it has a well-established place in petrographical classifications because these peculiar composite arenaceous deposits are very frequent among Silurian and Cambrian rocks, and are less common in Mesozoic or Cenozoic strata. Their essential features are their gritty character and their complex composition. By increasing metamorphism, greywackes frequently pass into mica-schists, chloritic schists and sedimentary gneisses.

Role in the history of geology
Greywacke, a common rock in Britain, was an object of study in Britain where the Geological Society was founded in 1807 and excited much public interest in geology. Greywacke was interesting because it was found in many places in Britain and its occurrence in particular places was evidence of the pattern of geological strata that had been laid down. See The Greywacke: How a Priest, a Soldier and a School Teacher Uncovered 300 Million Years of History.

See also
 Greywacke zone
 Torlesse Greywacke

References

External links

 National Park Service site Presidio
 Franciscan Greywacke/Shales

Sedimentary rocks
Sandstone